Mr. Deity is a series of satirical short films that parody aspects of religion, created by Brian Keith Dalton and distributed by Lazy Eye Pictures.  It stars Brian Keith Dalton, Jimbo Marshall, Sean Douglas, and Amy Rohren. It premiered on December 27, 2006. The show was  hosted on YouTube, after a spell on Crackle and is currently available on the Mr. Deity channel on YouTube. In early 2012 Jimbo Marshall ended his participation to work in his own production company, "Your Video Solution."

History
After the 2004 tsunami hit Sri Lanka, director Brian Keith Dalton was amazed that his then brother-in-law, a Sri Lankan, could still find "God's hand" in the disaster after so many people lost their lives suddenly. This prompted him to write about it, at first for his own amusement, and becoming the inspiration for the show. In late 2006 Dalton decided to make a series of short comedy films about God surveying the universe with his assistant.  The first episode, called "Mr. Deity and the Evil," features only Dalton and his friend, cinematographer Jimbo Marshall, making decisions about what evils to allow. Jesus appears in the second episode, played by Sean Douglas. Amy Rohren rounded out the cast, portraying Lucifer (or Lucy) later in the first season.

After the last episode of the first season, Dalton signed a deal with Sony Pictures Entertainment to create a TV version of Mr. Deity for HBO. The deal also made the second season of the web series exclusive to Sony's comedy website, Crackle.com. The Sony deal eventually fell through, prompting Dalton to bring the series back to YouTube. In May 2009 a trailer parodying Frost/Nixon using the cast of Mr. Deity was released, inaugurating the third season of the show.

During an interview in 2023, Brian Keith Dalton said the sixth season would be the final of the series.

Theological views
Mr. Deity often expresses annoyance with organized religion or human beings who claim to speak in his name, although he often treats this as an issue of improper attribution rather than a theological problem. In "Mr. Deity and the Book" and "Mr. Deity and the Book, Part Deux", he becomes very irate over being attributed as the author of the Bible, due to not being included in the editorial process.

Mormons are specifically named in "Mr. Deity and the Book" as being a source of irritation to Mr. Deity due to their scriptural canonization of the idea that certain non-African humans with dark skin were cursed by God to lose their whiteness due to wicked behavior. Notably, Dalton is himself a former Mormon or Formon, a term he coined in 1996.

Cast

Brian Keith Dalton: Mr. Deity, a.k.a. El, "El? Oh, him."  The creator.  Has little interest in—or even full comprehension of—the lives of humans and admits creating humans "to pass the time, provide some entertainment."  He proclaims he's not a "details guy," adding that "Lucy handles that" and generally takes the credit for Larry's ideas as well as delegating most tasks to him. He is in an on-again–off-again relationship with Lucy. His misunderstandings of humans, general confusion, self-absorption and pop-culture references are generally the basis of episodes.
Jimbo Marshall: Larry, Mr. Deity's assistant. He often helps the Deity stay on task and reviews important details in the plan, clarifying his work, and recording that which is noteworthy; for instance, in putting together the Top Ten list. Despite popular thinking, he is not a version of the Holy Spirit.
Sean Douglas: Jesus,  Does Mr. Deity a "really big favor" by going to Earth, leading a sinless life, then being sacrificed in the original version of the script. In return he is made "full partner, 1/3 vote".  However his own views are often at odds with the Deity's plan, either out of general confusion, misunderstanding, or moral objection. He contributed to the Top Ten list, tries to make sense out of the Deity's edicts, and attempts to get out of being crucified.  In the first season Mr. Deity often forgets his name and has called him Jesse.  Jesus also occasionally calls Mr. Deity "Dad." Notably, neither the Deity nor Jesus have a full grasp of the Trinity.
Amy Rohren: Lucifer or "Lucy", was dumped by Mr. Deity prior to the show and was then appointed by him to run hell. At one point she hired Nietzsche to kill him in retaliation for dumping her. When introduced she requested to have her mascot changed to a "bunny" instead of a snake, and they compromised on a goat. She and Mr. Deity have an on–off relationship. He uses her to facilitate his plan and inflict suffering on others for his amusement.
Jarrett Lennon Kaufman: Timmy, technical adviser to Mr. Deity.

Awards and recognition
On August 21, 2010, Dalton was honored with an award recognizing his contributions with Mr. Deity in the skeptical field, from The IIG during its 10th Anniversary Gala.

Episodes

Season 1

Season 2

Season 3

Season 4 (prequel)

Season 5

Season 6

Notes

References

External links
Official site
Mr. Deity at the Internet Movie Database
Downloadable episodes at PodcastAlley
Interview by John Rael for the Independent Investigations Group
Interview about the show

2006 web series debuts
American comedy web series
YouTube original programming
Humanism
Atheism activism
Religious comedy and humour
Religious comedy websites
Fiction about deities